Johan Gottlieb Gahn (19 August 1745 – 8 December 1818) was a Swedish chemist and metallurgist who isolated manganese in 1774.

Gahn studied in Uppsala 1762 – 1770 and became acquainted with chemists Torbern Bergman and Carl Wilhelm Scheele. 1770 he settled in Falun, where he introduced improvements in copper smelting, and participated in building up several factories, including those for vitriol, sulfur and red paint.

He was the chemist for The Swedish Board of Mines Bergskollegium from 1773 – 1817. Gahn was however very reluctant to publish his scientific findings himself, but freely communicated them to Bergman and Scheele. One of Gahn's discoveries was that manganese dioxide could be reduced to manganese metal using carbon, becoming the first to isolate this element in its metal form.

In 1784, Gahn was elected a member of the Royal Swedish Academy of Sciences. He also made a managerial career in Swedish mining.

See also
 Gahnite, named after Johan Gottlieb Gahn.

References

Further reading

External links 

 Article in Svenskt biografiskt handlexikon 
 Eggerlz H.P., Palmstedt C. Nekrolog. Jahann Gottlieb Gahns Leben. // Jahrbuch der Chemie und Physik. - Nürnberg, 1822. P. 140.

1745 births
1818 deaths
18th-century Swedish chemists
Uppsala University alumni
Discoverers of chemical elements
Members of the Royal Swedish Academy of Sciences
19th-century Swedish chemists
Manganese
Age of Liberty people